Ami Boué Bluff is the bluff rising to 808 m in the north extremity of Laclavère Plateau on Trinity Peninsula, Antarctic Peninsula. The feature is named after the German-French-Austrian explorer of the Balkans Ami Boué (1794-1881).

Location
German-British mapping in 1996.

Maps
 Trinity Peninsula. Scale 1:250000 topographic map No. 5697. Institut für Angewandte Geodäsie and British Antarctic Survey, 1996.
 Antarctic Digital Database (ADD). Scale 1:250000 topographic map of Antarctica. Scientific Committee on Antarctic Research (SCAR). Since 1993, regularly upgraded and updated.

Notes

References
 Bulgarian Antarctic Gazetteer. Antarctic Place-names Commission. (details in Bulgarian, basic data in English)
 Ami Boué Peak. SCAR Composite Antarctic Gazetteer

External links
 Ami Boué Bluff. Copernix satellite image

Mountains of Trinity Peninsula
Bulgaria and the Antarctic